Hipparchia fidia, the striped grayling, is a butterfly of the family Nymphalidae. It is found on the Iberian Peninsula, the Balearic Islands and in south-eastern France and the bordering parts of Italy and North Africa.

Description in Seitz
S. fidia L. (44 d). Above similar to the preceding [  fatua ] , but the underside much more variegated and brighter: the ocelli of the forewing large, broadly bordered with yellow, there being before them white smears which are proximally bordered by a black line. On the underside of the hindwing the exterior black discal line projects behind the apex of the cell as a broad tooth; it is externally broadly white and beyond it there are moreover strong white smears extending towards the distal margin.

Description 

Biology 
The butterflies fly from July to August depending on the location.

The larvae feed on various types of grass.

References

Hipparchia (butterfly)
Butterflies of Europe
Butterflies described in 1767
Taxa named by Carl Linnaeus